Henry John Schlacks (July 4, 1867 – January 6, 1938) was primarily known as an ecclesiologist in a 19th Century sense of the word, meaning one who designs and decorates churches. He was from Chicago, Illinois, and is considered by many to be the finest of Chicago's church architects. Schlacks trained at MIT and in the offices of Adler & Sullivan before starting his own practice. He founded the Architecture Department at the University of Notre Dame and designed several buildings in the Chicago area.

Churches 

Among the Churches that Schlacks designed are:

Chicago:
 St. Adalbert Church
 St. Anthony Church
 St.  Boniface Church 
 St. Clara Church (later St. Gelasius Church)
 St. Ignatius Church
 St. Ita Church
 St. John of God Church
 St. Mary of the Lake Church, 1917 
 St. Paul Church
 St. Martin of Tours Church (Schlacks was supervising architect for this building, plans supplied by a German architect)
 Angel Gurdian Croatian Catholic Mission Church 

Evanston, Il
 St. Nicholas Church

Forest Park, Illinois
 St. John Lutheran Church

Oak Park, Illinois:
 St. Edmund Church 

Skokie, Illinois:
 St. Peter Church

Indianapolis, IN
 St. Joan of Arc Church

Topeka, KS
 Holy Name-Mater Dei Church

Cincinnati, OH
 St. Mark Church

Other Works 

 Denver & Rio Grande Western Railroad Depot, Grand Junction, Colorado, 1906
 Denver & Rio Grande Western Depot, Salt Lake City, Utah, 1910
 Idaho Building (Boise, Idaho)
 Wm. J. Cassidy Tire Building, Chicago, Illinois, 1902

Gallery

See also 
Polish Cathedral style

References

External links 
Architectural Photographs of the Churches of HJ Schlacks

 
1867 births
University of Notre Dame faculty
1938 deaths
Architects from Chicago
Architects of Roman Catholic churches
Ecclesiologists